Dracula, l'amour plus fort que la mort ('Dracula: Love stronger than death') is a French musical in two acts by French choreographer Kamel Ouali, his debut production. It was first performed on 30 September 2011 at the Palais des Sports de Paris and continued until 1 January 2012. The Kamel Ouali work was inspired by Bram Stoker's 1897 novel Dracula and by the 1992 film version by Francis Ford Coppola. A filmed version of the work was also shown on wide screens throughout France between 20 and 22 July 2012.

Personnel
Production: Thierry Suc
Staging and choreography: Kamel Ouali
Assistant staging: Marjorie Ascione 
Assistant choreographers: Patricia Delon, David Drouard
Air choreographers: Florence Delahaye, Gabriel Dehu
Assistant (comedy): Phillippe Lelièvre
Vocal coach: Nathalie Dupuy
Costumes designer: Dominique Borg
Scenography and decor creation: Bernard Arnould, Elodie Grimal, Antonio Nigro, Sylvestre Guené
Lighting: Jacques Rouveyrollis
Projections: Gilles Papain
Sound: Stéphane Plisson and Alex Maggi
Make up: Déborah Moreno and Maite Gutiérrez
Hairstylist: Any d'Avray
Musical direction: Volodia and Philippe Uminski
Casting: Bruno Berbères
Label: Warner Music France
Composers: Fabien Cahen, Jennifer Ayache, Pierre-Antoine "Nius" Melki, Volodia, Feed, Pascal Trogoff, Busta Funk, Davide Esposito, Patrice Guirao, Benoit Poher, Adrien Gallo, Brice Davoli
3D creation: Philippe Gérard et 3Dlized

Actors
Golan Yosef - Count Dracula
Nathalie Fauquette - Mina Murray
Gregory Deck - Sorcerer
Lola Ces - Poison
Ginie Line - Satine
Julien Loko - Jonathan Harker
Anaïs Delva - Lucy Westenra
Aymeric Ribot - Dr Abraham Van Helsing
Florent Torres - Angel
Laurent Levy - Dr Seward
Sébastien Sfedj - dancer, story teller and role of Joker of the palace

Alternative actors
Sébastien Agius - Sorcerer and Angel (replacement for Gregory Deck et Florent Torres)
Fanny Fourquez - Lucy, Satine and Poison (replacement for Anaïs Delva, Ginie Line et Lola Ces)
Julien Lamassonne - Jonathan and Van Helsing (replacement for Julien Loko et Aymeric Ribot)

Dancers
 Brahem Aiache
 Salim Bagayoko
 Jonathan Ber
 Hélène Buannic
 Mélodie Cailleret
 Joseph Di Marco
 Aurélie Giboire (also a double for Nathalie Fauquette as Mina)
 Alias Hilsum
 Louya Kounkou
 Stéphane Lavalle
 Clément Le Disquay
 Estelle Manas Sahoulamide
 Marco Purcaro (also a double for Golan Yosef as Dracula)
 Abkari Saitouli
 Charlotte Siepiora (also a double for Nathalie Fauquette as Mina)
 Roman Bonaton (aerial artist)
 Cécile Magdeleine (aerial artist)
 Yohann Tete (also a double for Golan Yosef as Dracula)
Other dancers (on contract or training): Melissa Assi, Emmanuel Auvy, Elisabeth Duguêret, Roxane Garrigos, Yoan Grosjean, Yann Herve, Rebecca Journo, Grégoire Malandin, Sandra Pericou, Alicia Rault, Roman Vikouloff

2011 musicals
French musicals
Plays based on Dracula
Musicals based on novels